Sebob (Sebop, Cebop) is a Kenyah language of Sarawak.

External links

 Kaipuleohone has archived recordings and written materials for Sebop

Languages of Malaysia
Kenyah languages
Endangered Austronesian languages